Foreknowledge is knowledge regarding future events. It may also refer to:

 Foresight (disambiguation)
 Precognition - prior viewing of some future event
 Knowledge of predestination
 Prediction or forecasting – calculated, informed or uninformed guesses regarding future events
 Prognosis (disambiguation) – typically, informed predictions about future events in a confined context
 Prophecy – future knowledge obtained from divine or supernatural entities